This is a list of National Historic Sites in the province of Newfoundland and Labrador.  There are 47 National Historic Sites designated in Newfoundland and Labrador, 10 of which are administered by Parks Canada (identified below by the beaver icon ). The first National Historic Sites to be designated in the province were Fort Amherst, Fort Townshend and Signal Hill in 1951.

The Beaumont-Hamel Newfoundland Memorial, a National Historic Site commemorating  Dominion of Newfoundland forces killed during World War I, is located in France.

Numerous National Historic Events also occurred across Newfoundland & Labrador, and are identified at places associated with them, using the same style of federal plaque which marks National Historic Sites. Several National Historic Persons are commemorated throughout the province in the same way. The markers do not indicate which designation—a Site, Event, or Person—a subject has been given.

This list uses names designated by the national Historic Sites and Monuments Board, which may differ from other names for these sites.

National Historic Sites

See also

History of Newfoundland and Labrador
List of historic places in Newfoundland and Labrador

References

 
Newfoundland and Labrador